Alan Eduardovich Gagloev (born 6 February 1981), also transliterated as Gagloyev, is a South Ossetian politician and former intelligence officer, who is the current president of South Ossetia since 2022. He also served as chairman of the Nykhaz party from 2020 to 2023.

Early life
Alan Gagloev was born on 6 February 1981, in Tskhinvali. He graduated from the South Ossetian State University in 2002 and was hired by the Ministry of Economic Development of South Ossetia as the chief specialist of the department for supporting small and medium-sized businesses.

He fought in the Russo-Georgian War in 2008. During the war, Gagloev's family "suffered heavy losses".

2017 presidential campaign and joining Nykhaz 

He ran unsuccessfully for president of South Ossetia in 2017, losing to Anatoly Bibilov. After his loss, he announced the creation of his own political party, the Alanian Union in September 2017. However, in May 2018, the South Ossetian Ministry of Justice refused to register the party. In January 2019, the Alan Union joined New Ossetia who merged with the party Nykhaz. Gagloev went on to be elected chairman of Nykhaz in February 2020.

2022 presidential campaign

Gagloev ran for president a second time in the 2022 election. On 10 April 2022, he won the first round with 36.9% of the vote, passing incumbent president Anatoly Bibilov. Prior to the run-off, Gagloev received endorsements from the three candidates eliminated in the first round, Alexandr Pliyev, Garri Muldarov, and Dmitry Tasoyev, heading into the runoff against Bibilov. Bibilov had been endorsed by United Russia, the ruling party of Russia.

Gagloev defeated Bibilov in the run-off with 56.08% of the vote on 8 May 2022.
Bibilov admitted defeat in the elections, congratulated Gagloev and wished him "successful work for the good of the people".

Presidency
Following his election, he was sworn in as the new president on 24 May 2022. Domestically, Gagloev said the main issue of his presidency would be taking steps to improve the economy. Zita Besayeva was elected to replace him as leader of Nykhaz in February 2023.

Relations with Russia
Gagloev was seen by observers as being less supportive of holding a referendum to join Russia, saying that Russia was "still busy with other issues," in reference to the 2022 Russian invasion of Ukraine. The Kremlin Press Secretary Dmitry Peskov further stated on 24 May that in regards to the referendum, "No steps are being taken or planned by the Russian side connected with this." On 30 May 2022, he suspended the referendum called by his predecessor Bibilov until consultations with Russia are complete.

On 12 August 2022, Gagloev dismissed defense minister Vladimir Pukhaev due to an incident on 23 July 2022, which involved masked servicemen of the defense minister assaulting civilians in various locations throughout the region. Gagloev would assert his "supreme authority" over the armed forces after these events. This is after his predecessor had allowed parts of the South Ossetian military to be under the authority of the Russian army, as well as a large desertion by South Ossetians in the 2022 Russian invasion of Ukraine.

Relations with Georgia
While still campaigning, Gagloev visited the Akhalgori Municipality, which has a substantial Georgian population, and urged support for allowing residents to travel to Georgia more freely. This had previously not been possible without medical documentation, and was further complicated by the COVID-19 pandemic. After assuming office, Gagloev received criticism from Russian news anchor Sergey Karnaukhov for dismissing the referendum to join Russia as well as supporting easier travel to Georgia, accusing him of being an American and Georgian asset. The governments of both Georgia and South Ossetia denied these claims. Beginning in August 2022, South Ossetia announced it would open checkpoints with Georgia from the 20th to the 30th of each month.

Personal life 
Gagloev is married and has two children.

Notes

References 

1981 births
Living people
Ossetian politicians
People from Tskhinvali
Presidents of South Ossetia
Nykhaz politicians